The Robin Hood effect is an economic occurrence where income is redistributed so that economic inequality is reduced.  The effect is named after Robin Hood, said to have stolen from the rich to give to the poor.

Causes

A Robin Hood effect can be caused by a large number of different policies or economic decisions, not all of which are specifically aimed at reducing inequality.  This article lists only some of these.

Natural national development

Simon Kuznets argued that one major factor behind levels of economic inequality is the stage of economic development of a country. Kuznets described a curve-like relationship between level of income and inequality, as shown. That theory prescribes that countries with very low levels of development will have relatively equal distributions of wealth.

As a country develops, it necessarily acquires more capital, and the owners of this capital will then have more wealth and income, which introduces inequality. However, eventually various possible redistribution mechanisms such as trickle down effects and social welfare programs will lead to a Robin Hood effect, with wealth redistributed to the poor.  Therefore, more developed countries move back to lower levels of inequality.

Non-proportional income tax

Many countries have an income tax system where the first part of a worker's salary is taxed very little or not at all, while those on higher salaries must pay a higher tax rate on earnings over a certain threshold, known as progressive taxation. This has the effect of the better-off population paying a higher proportion of their salary in tax, effectively subsidising the less-well off, leading to a Robin Hood effect.

Specifically, a progressive tax is a tax by which the tax rate increases as the taxable base amount increases. "Progressive" describes a distribution effect on income or expenditure, referring to the way the rate progresses from low to high, where the average tax rate is less than the marginal tax rate. It can be applied to individual taxes or to a tax system as a whole; a year, multi-year, or lifetime. Progressive taxes attempt to reduce the tax incidence of people with a lower ability-to-pay, as they shift the incidence increasingly to those with a higher ability-to-pay.

Cross-subsidisation of mobile telephony

In many developing countries, mobile communications networks tend to experience a large network externality, which regulators and operators seek to correct by subsidising subscriptions through increased prices for call termination. That then allows the less-well off in that country to gain access to communications services, often for free (on a prepay tariff). The additional cost is then levied on subscribers who make calls to these new subscribers; the call originators tend to be better-off. Therefore, despite there being no direct transfer of money, there is a strong Robin Hood effect, with the better-off subsidising the less well-off.

See also

 Income redistribution
 Distribution of wealth
 Economic inequality
 Federal taxation and spending by state
 Robin Hood
 Robin Hood tax

References

Taxation and redistribution
Robin Hood
Egalitarianism